Robert Newcomb (born 1951) is an American author of fantasy novels published by Del Rey Books. In 2008, Del Rey ceased publishing his books.

Selected works
 The Fifth Sorceress (2002), .
 The Gates of Dawn (2003), .
 The Scrolls of the Ancients (2004), .
 Savage Messiah (2005), .
 A March into Darkness (2007), .
 Rise of the Blood Royal (December 26, 2007), .

The Fifth Sorceress
Newcomb's debut novel The Fifth Sorceress was accused of misogyny or sexism, and was critically panned. In response to the criticism, Newcomb said his intent was not "to be sexist or to be controversial, or to espouse some anti-politically correct viewpoint. It just happened to be the particular story I wanted to tell to get the saga rolling."

References

External links
 
 

1951 births
21st-century American novelists
American fantasy writers
American male novelists
Living people
People from Florida
21st-century American male writers